= Esmond Mountain =

Mountain in Oregon, United States

Coordinates: 42.4445°N 122.5048°W

Esmond Mountain is a summit in the U.S. state of Oregon. The elevation is 4,895 feet (1,492 m).

Esmond Mountain was named after Edwin Esmond, a pioneer settler.
